Takaya Mutō is a Japanese politician and a former member of the National Diet where he sat in the House of Representatives. Previously a member of the Liberal Democratic Party, he resigned his party membership in 2015.

References

Living people
Liberal Democratic Party (Japan) politicians
Members of the House of Representatives (Japan)
Year of birth missing (living people)